Afkhami is a surname. Notable people with the surname include:

Behrooz Afkhami (born 1956), Iranian film director and screenwriter
Gholam Reza Afkhami, Iranian historian
Mahnaz Afkhami (born 1941), Iranian academic, activist, and writer

See also
Afkham